Hwang Young-shik (born 13 November 1990) is a South Korean equestrian athlete. During the 2010 Asian Games in Guangzhou he won individual gold and team gold in dressage representing South Korea. In 2014 during the 2014 Asian Games defended his title by winning again individual gold and team gold. In 2018 he decided not to focus on the Asian Games but moved to Germany to train and to qualify for the Olympic Games. The following year 2019 he obtained an individual team spot for the 2020 Olympic Games in Tokyo.

References

1990 births
Living people
South Korean equestrians
South Korean dressage riders
Asian Games gold medalists for South Korea
Asian Games medalists in equestrian
Equestrians at the 2010 Asian Games
Medalists at the 2010 Asian Games
Equestrians at the 2014 Asian Games
Medalists at the 2014 Asian Games
People from Osan
Sportspeople from Gyeonggi Province
21st-century South Korean people